Behind the Last Line is a 	Soviet crime fighter directed by Nikolai Stambula   and starring Yevgeny Sidikhin  and Igor Talkov.

Plot
Boxer Viktor Dryomov, having left prison, he was serving 3 years for beating, finds himself in a difficult situation  the woman he loved went to the old antiquary, there is no money and no work. Soon, he falls under the supervision of racketeers, who, through skillful provocation and police connections, are trying to attract the former boxing champion to criminal activities. It’s not easy to refuse to gangsters, and under the influence of their blackmail, he agrees to work for them. However, later Victor still refuses to continue to engage in racketeering, and as a result a false denunciation is fabricated against him. Dremova is detained by the police, but he does not wait for the charges to be brought. Having escaped from the police station, the hero decides to act and alone destroys the bandits.

Cast
 Yevgeny Sidikhin as Viktor Dryomov
 Igor Talkov as Garik, racketeer
 Viktor Stepanov as Starodubtsev, Dryomov's coach  
 Alina Tarkinskaya as prostitute Mary
 Yekaterina Kmit as Mary's friend
 Vladimir Talkov as racketeer driver
 Tatyana Lyutaeva as Irina 
 Vladimir Kashpur as   Nikolai
 Igor Mirkurbanov as racketeer Tolyan
 Nikita Dzhigurda as cook in kebab house

Production 
Exactly 1 year before the murder of Igor Talkov, on October 6, 1990, the scene of the murder of his hero was filmed. Filming took place in Moscow on Kaluga Square, Goncharnaya Street, Chistoprudny Boulevard and Yelokhovskaya Square.

References

External links 
  

Soviet action drama films
1990s action drama films
Russian vigilante films
Films set in Moscow
Films shot in Moscow
Mosfilm films
Russian boxing films
1990s vigilante films
1991 drama films
1991 films